Leanne Barrette-Hulsenberg (born August 18, 1967), from Roseville, California and currently of North Ogden, Utah, was one of the top female professional bowlers on the Professional Women's Bowling Association (PWBA) Tour. In a career that spanned 17 years, she won 26 PWBA titles and was  a three-time PWBA Player of the Year (1990, 1991 and 2002). In 2007, she was elected to the USBC Hall of Fame for Superior Performance, and was inducted with the 2008 class. She was inducted into the PWBA Hall of Fame in 2019, as a member of the first Hall of Fame class since that organization suspended operations in 2003.

After turning pro at age 19 in 1987, Barrette caught on quickly, winning three PWBA titles and Rookie of the Year honors. Her best pro season was in 1991, when she won three titles, was the PWBA tour's leading money winner, and captured both PWBA Player of the Year and the Bowling Writers Association of America's Bowler of the Year honors. In 1999, she won the prestigious USBC Queens tournament (then known as the WIBC Queens) for her first major title. On June 30, 2011, Leanne won her 27th professional title (and first since 2002) when she defeated defending champion Kelly Kulick at the U.S. Women's Open in Arlington, Texas.

Nicknamed "Boomer," she was a familiar face in the heyday of televised women's bowling, making over 100 total TV appearances. During her career, she also won two Robby Awards—an award for sportsmanship and professionalism voted on by her PWBA peers. She is one of only four women to earn over $1 million (U.S.) in her career on the PWBA Tour.

Hulsenberg has been part of Senior Team USA (for players age 50 and over) since 2017. Together with her teammates, she won team gold medals in 2017 and 2019 at the World Bowling Senior Championships. She also won All-Events gold in 2017 and 2019. In 2019, Leanne won gold in Doubles with partner Tish Johnson.

Leanne's husband, Gary Hulsenberg, is a director of marketing for Storm Bowling in Brigham City, Utah, which prompted their move from California. Leanne now also works for Storm as a marketing coordinator. The couple has a son, Barrett, born in 2009.

References

1960s births
Living people
American ten-pin bowling players
Sportspeople from Roseville, California
People from North Ogden, Utah